Maxime Monfort (born 14 January 1983) is a Belgian former professional road racing cyclist, who competed professionally between 2004 and 2019 for the , , , , and  teams.

Monfort won a variety of races including the Tour de Luxembourg in 2004, the Bayern Rundfahrt in 2010, and the Belgian National Time Trial Championships in 2009. Monfort has also had top grand tour finishes including a 6th-place finish in the 2011 Vuelta a España, and a 16th-place finish in the 2012 Tour de France. He finished 14th in the 2013 Tour de France, marking his highest finish in the Tour.

Major results

2003
 4th Circuit de Wallonie
2004
 1st  Overall Tour de Luxembourg
1st  Young rider classification
1st Stage 3
 1st  Young rider classification Ronde van Nederland
 4th Overall Ster Elektrotoer
 6th Overall Tour de la Région Wallonne
 6th Flèche Hesbignonne
 8th Overall Tour du Limousin
2005
 2nd Overall Étoile de Bessèges
1st  Young rider classification
 3rd Overall Regio-Tour
 4th Overall Tour de l'Avenir
 5th Overall Tour de Luxembourg
 6th Grand Prix Pino Cerami
 7th Overall Ster Elektrotoer
 8th Overall Tour de la Région Wallonne
2007
 7th Overall Deutschland Tour
2008
 4th Overall Critérium International
 5th Overall Tour of the Basque Country
 9th Overall Volta a la Comunitat Valenciana
 9th Overall Critérium du Dauphiné Libéré
 10th Overall Circuit Franco-Belge
2009
 1st  Time trial, National Road Championships
 2nd Overall Bayern Rundfahrt
 4th Overall Critérium International
 4th Chrono des Nations
 5th Overall Eneco Tour
 10th Overall Tour de Suisse
2010
 1st  Overall Bayern Rundfahrt
1st Stage 4 (ITT)
 5th Grand Prix Cycliste de Montréal
 6th Overall Vuelta a Andalucía
 8th Overall Critérium International
 8th Grand Prix Cycliste de Québec
2011
 4th Overall Tour de Luxembourg
 6th Overall Vuelta a España
1st Stage 1 (TTT)
 7th Gran Premio Bruno Beghelli
 8th Overall Tour of Oman
 10th Overall Paris–Nice
 10th Overall Tour de Suisse
2012
 6th Overall Critérium International
 7th Overall Paris–Nice
 8th Overall Tour de Luxembourg
 9th Overall Vuelta a Andalucía
2013
 4th Overall Tour Méditerranéen
 10th Overall Eneco Tour
2015
 8th Overall Étoile de Bessèges
2016
 8th Overall Étoile de Bessèges
 9th Overall Tour de l'Ain
2018
 9th Binche–Chimay–Binche

Grand Tour general classification results timeline

References

External links

Belgian male cyclists
1983 births
Living people
Cyclists at the 2008 Summer Olympics
Olympic cyclists of Belgium
People from Bastogne
Belgian Vuelta a España stage winners
Cyclists from Luxembourg (Belgium)